Igor "Mrme" Angelovski (born 2 June 1976) is a Macedonian professional football manager and former player.

Playing career

Club
As player he played in the Slovenian First League with Publikum Celje between 1998 and 2000. He also played with Makedonija Gjorce Petrov, Pelister, Cementarnica (twice) and Pobeda.

Managerial career
In October 2015, Angelovski became the new manager of the Macedonia national team as a successor to Ljubinko Drulović who has left to the Serbian SuperLiga club Partizan. Among the national team, to December 2015, Angelovski had coached Rabotnički in the Macedonian First League.

Managerial statistics

Honours

Player
Cementarnica
Macedonian Cup: 2002–03
FK Pobeda
Macedonian Cup: 2001–02

Manager
Rabotnički
Macedonian First League: 2013–14
Macedonian Cup: 2013–14, 2014–15

References

External links 

1976 births
Living people
Footballers from Skopje
Association football midfielders
Macedonian footballers
FK Cementarnica 55 players
NK Celje players
FK Skopje players
FK Srem players
Macedonian First Football League players
Slovenian PrvaLiga players
Serbian First League players
Macedonian expatriate footballers
Expatriate footballers in Slovenia
Macedonian expatriate sportspeople in Slovenia
Expatriate footballers in Serbia
Macedonian expatriate sportspeople in Serbia
Macedonian football managers
FK Rabotnički managers
North Macedonia national football team managers
UEFA Euro 2020 managers